

405001–405100 

|-bgcolor=#f2f2f2
| colspan=4 align=center | 
|}

405101–405200 

|-bgcolor=#f2f2f2
| colspan=4 align=center | 
|}

405201–405300 

|-id=207
| 405207 Konstanz ||  || Konstanz, a city in south-west Germany, situated on the Bodensee lake and the Rhine river bordering Switzerland || 
|}

405301–405400 

|-bgcolor=#f2f2f2
| colspan=4 align=center | 
|}

405401–405500 

|-bgcolor=#f2f2f2
| colspan=4 align=center | 
|}

405501–405600 

|-id=571
| 405571 Erdőspál ||  || Paul Erdős (Erdős Pál; 1913–1996) was a Hungarian mathematician, much of whose work centered around discrete mathematics. His work leaned towards solving previously open problems, rather than developing or exploring new areas of mathematics. He published around 1500 mathematical papers during his lifetime. || 
|}

405601–405700 

|-bgcolor=#f2f2f2
| colspan=4 align=center | 
|}

405701–405800 

|-bgcolor=#f2f2f2
| colspan=4 align=center | 
|}

405801–405900 

|-bgcolor=#f2f2f2
| colspan=4 align=center | 
|}

405901–406000 

|-bgcolor=#f2f2f2
| colspan=4 align=center | 
|}

References 

405001-406000